"As Long as I Fall" is a song made by Helloween, a German power metal band, and was released as the single from their album Gambling with the Devil on 27 September 2007.  This song marks the first time that Helloween have released a single as download only, although it was available as a CD in Japan. Though it has a darker approach in the verses, the song turns quite happy in the chorus. The lyrics are about the lack of civil courage.

Track listing

Personnel
 Andi Deris – vocals
 Michael Weikath – lead and rhythm guitars
 Sascha Gerstner – lead and rhythm guitars, backing vocals
 Markus Grosskopf – bass
 Daniel Löble – drums

References

External links
 Official Helloween Messageboard 
 Official Helloween Website 

2007 singles
Helloween songs
Songs written by Andi Deris